Rowe Village, previously known as State Street Village, is a residence hall for the Illinois Institute of Technology in Chicago, Illinois. Designed by Helmut Jahn of Murphy-Jahn Associates, the dormitory was completed in 2003.

Although it appears that Rowe Village is a single continuous building, it consists of three different buildings built next to each other and sharing the same facade; they are commonly referred to as "north", "middle", and "south". Each building has five stories, with dorms on the "north" and "south" sides of the building and an elevator and common area splitting the two sections in the middle. Access can only be gained via ID card scanners. Suites usually consist of two double rooms that are connected by a shared central bathroom.

Rowe Village also has kitchens and laundry rooms on all floors, with a lounge and open deck located on the top floor of each of the three separate buildings.

References

External links 
State Street Village, IIT Housing
projectchicago.org entry: State Street Village
 Info about the project at the Architectural Record
 

Illinois Institute of Technology
School buildings completed in 2003
Buildings and structures in Chicago
Helmut Jahn buildings
Modernist architecture in Illinois
Postmodern architecture in the United States
2003 establishments in Illinois